"Firestarter" is a song recorded by Australian singer Samantha Jade. The song was digitally released on 28 June 2013. "Firestarter" was written by Jade, David Musumeci and Anthony Egizii, and produced by Musumeci and Egizii under their stage name DNA Songs. "Firestarter" debuted and peaked at number nine on the ARIA Singles Chart and was certified platinum for selling 70,000 copies. The track was promoted by performances on the first results show of season five of The X Factor Australia on 26 August 2013 and Sunrise on 28 June 2013. The accompanying music video was directed by Christopher Freyand. It won ARIA Award for Best Video at the ARIA Music Awards of 2013.

Background and release
"Firestarter" was written by Samantha Jade and written/produced by David Musumeci and Anthony Egizii under their stage name DNA Songs. Jade has stated that Firestarter is about getting the party started and having fun.

"Firestarter" was made available for digital download and CD single on 28 June. An acoustic version of "Firestarter" was released to iTunes on 9 August. The preview of the song was used for fifth season of The X Factor promotion.

Promotion
The video for the song was directed by Christopher Freyand and released on 13 July 2013. Jade performed "Firestarter" for the first time on Sunrise.
Jade then performed "Firestarter" live on the first results show of season five of The X Factor Australia on 26 August 2013.

Legacy
"Firestarter" has been described as a gay anthem, with Jade expressing her surprise and gratitude for her gay fanbase in 2019.

Track listing

Charts

Weekly charts

Year-end charts

Certification

Release history

References

2013 songs
ARIA Award-winning songs
Samantha Jade songs
Songs written by David Musumeci
Songs written by Anthony Egizii
Song recordings produced by DNA Songs
2013 singles
Songs written by Samantha Jade